Mount Mather is a  mountain in the Alaska Range, in Denali National Park and Preserve. Mount Mather lies to the northeast of Denali, overlooking Brooks Glacier. The mountain itself is covered by glaciers. Mount Mather was named in 1947 in honor of National Park Service director Stephen Mather.

Climate

Based on the Köppen climate classification, Mount Mather is located in a subarctic climate zone with long, cold, snowy winters, and mild summers. Temperatures can drop below −20 °C with wind chill factors below −30 °C. Precipitation runoff from the mountain drains into the Tanana River drainage basin. The months May through June offer the most favorable weather for climbing or viewing.

See also
Mountain peaks of Alaska

References

External links
 Weather forecast: Mount Mather

Alaska Range
Mountains of Denali Borough, Alaska
Denali National Park and Preserve
Mountains of Alaska